Veedu Theda is a 2011 Indian Telugu-language action film directed by Chinni Krishna and produced by Chakri Chigurapati under Lakshmi Narasimha Entertainments banner. It stars Nikhil Siddharth and Pooja Bose. Released on 18 November 2011, the film became moderately successful at the box office, and went on to run for 50 days at select centers. In 2012, the film was dubbed and released in Hindi as Panjaa The Tiger.

Plot
Katthi Seenu (Nikhil Siddharth) is a carefree and brash youngster from Tirupati, who lives with his sister (Hema) and her husband (Krishna Bhagavaan). A chance meeting with Love Kumar (Ali) leads him to Bheemavaram, where he comes across Meghana (Pooja Bose). It is love at first sight for Seenu but Meghana does not reciprocate his feelings.

As the story progresses, it is revealed that Meghana has a past that is connected to the notorious don Liquor Shankar (Sayaji Shinde) and a jailed convict Das (Suman). They start pursuing Meghana and it is now up to Seenu to step in as her saviour.

Cast
 Nikhil Siddharth as Kaththi Seenu
 Pooja Bose as Meghana
 Ali as Love Kumar
 Brahmanandam as Banana Baba
 Krishna Bhagavaan as Seenu's Brother in Law
 Hema as Seenu's Sister
 Raghu Babu as Yugandhar
 M. S. Narayana as Pachipulusu Nageswara Rao
 Aas Mohammad Abbasi as Kartik 
 Sayaji Shinde as Liquor Shankar
 Suman as Das
 Master Bharath as Abbayi Raju
 Fish Venkat

Soundtrack
The soundtrack, consisting of five songs, was composed by Chakri.

Reception
The Times of India gave the film three stars out of five, calling the screenplay "unimaginative and the music formulaic, composed exclusively for the front rows." 123Telugu gave the film two and a half stars, labeling it an "outdated comedy", praising Nikhil and some of the spoofs, while criticism was aimed strongly towards Bose, dialogues and most of the comedy scenes.

References

External links

2011 films
2010s Telugu-language films
Indian action films